Ricardo Julio Villa (born 18 August 1952), more commonly known as Ricky Villa, is an Argentine football coach and former professional midfielder. He was famous for his time playing football from 1970 to 1989.

Career
Villa was born in Roque Pérez, Buenos Aires. In the 1970s he played successively for Quilmes, Atlético de Tucumán and Racing Club. At the 1978 FIFA World Cup, he was a member of the Argentinian team that won the tournament and made two appearances as a substitute in the second round. Afterwards, he was snapped up by Tottenham Hotspur's Keith Burkinshaw together with Ossie Ardiles.

Arriving to a ticker tape welcome at White Hart Lane, Villa scored against Nottingham Forest on his debut at the City Ground. Villa scored a total of 25 goals in 179 Spurs appearances, including his winning goal against Manchester City in the 1981 FA Cup Final replay – for which he won the Wembley goal of the century award in 2001. He had also opened the scoring in the 8th minute of that final replay. He was withdrawn from the 1982 FA Cup Final Tottenham team, due to the outbreak of the Falklands Conflict.

Villa played on in Argentina, Colombia and the United States before ending his career in the lower leagues of Argentine football with Defensa y Justicia.

Villa also represented Argentina in the 1991 edition of the World Cup of Masters, scoring in the opening round against England.

He dedicated himself to politics during the 1990s, but since July 2005 has been the technical secretary of Talleres de Córdoba. He resides in Villa Carlos Paz with his wife and four children. As of November 2007, it was announced by FIFA that all members of winning World Cup squads prior to 1982 would receive World Cup winners medals and this includes Villa as part of the 1978 World Cup winning squad.

On 7 February 2008, Villa along with his compatriot Ossie Ardiles were inducted into the Tottenham Hotspur Hall of Fame.

Honours
Tottenham Hotspur
 FA Cup: 1980–81
 FA Charity Shield: 1981 (shared)

Argentina
 FIFA World Cup: 1978

References

External links

1952 births
Living people
Sportspeople from Buenos Aires Province
Argentine footballers
Association football midfielders
Argentina international footballers
FIFA World Cup-winning players
1978 FIFA World Cup players
FA Cup Final players
Argentine Primera División players
English Football League players
North American Soccer League (1968–1984) players
Quilmes Atlético Club footballers
Atlético Tucumán footballers
San Martín de Tucumán footballers
Racing Club de Avellaneda footballers
Tottenham Hotspur F.C. players
Fort Lauderdale Strikers (1977–1983) players
Deportivo Cali footballers
Defensa y Justicia footballers
Defensa y Justicia managers
Argentine football managers
Argentine expatriate footballers
Argentine expatriate sportspeople in England
Expatriate footballers in England
Argentine expatriate sportspeople in the United States
Expatriate footballers in Colombia
Atlético Tucumán managers